Owenville was a ghost town in Sutton County, Texas, United States.  The community's elevation and geographic coordinates are unknown, as nothing remains of the town.

References

Geography of Sutton County, Texas
Ghost towns in West Texas